Hilary Mason is an American entrepreneur and data scientist. She is the co-founder of the startup Fast Forward Labs.

Early life and education
Mason was born in New York City, and graduated from Grinnell College with a B.A. in computer science in 2000, and attended Brown University.

Career 
In 2010, she co-founded HackNY, a non-profit that helps integrate engineering students into the startup community in New York City.  After few years working as Chief Scientist at bitly, she quits the company in 2014 and co-founds Fast Forward Labs with Micha Gorelick, an other former bitly data scientist. She continues working as a data scientist at Accel. On September 7, 2017, Cloudera announced that it had acquired Fast Forward Labs, and that Mason would become Cloudera's Vice President of Research.

She has been interviewed by TechRepublic, Forbes, Wall Street Journal, ProgrammableWeb and others. She has further featured in both Glamour (magazine) and Scientific American

She has also been a member of Mayor Bloomberg's Technology and Innovation Advisory Council. In addition, Mason is a prominent member of NYCResistor, a hacker collective located in Brooklyn.

Fast Forward Labs
Fast Forward Labs specializes in machine learning intelligence research. Mason is the CEO of the Fast Forward Labs until the acquisition, on September 7, 2017 by Cloudera, a US open-source software company that offers support, training and software to business clients. Cloudera extended this offer due to FFL's experience and expertise in applying machine learning to practical business problems and their commitment to continual academic and industrial research surveys on new techniques. Mason explained that the merger of FFL with Cloudera would enable further and accelerated research opportunities on a larger platform.

Awards 
Mason received the TechFellows Engineering Leadership award in 2012 worth $100,000. She  was also on the Fortune 40 under 40 Ones to Watch list in 2011, as well as Crain's New York 40 under Forty list.

She was named within the Top 100 most creative people in business by Fast Company.

References

External links 
 
 cloudera.com

American business executives
Information systems researchers
Living people
Year of birth missing (living people)
Place of birth missing (living people)
Grinnell College alumni
Brown University alumni
People from New York City
Johnson & Wales University faculty
Data scientists
Women data scientists